The IHF Council is an institution of International Handball Federation (the governing body of handball and beach handball). It is the main decision-making body of the organization in the intervals of IHF Congress. Its members are elected by the IHF Congress. The council is a non-executive, supervisory and strategic body that sets the vision for IHF and global handball.

Composition
The council will be made up of the following individuals:
 IHF President
 IHF 1st Vice-President
 AHF: one vice-president and one member
 CAHB: one vice-president and one member
 EHF: one vice-president and one member
 NACHC: one member
 OCHF: one member
 SCAHC: one member
 IHF Treasurer
 Two IHF Executive Members
 Chairperson of COC
 Chairperson of PRC
 Chairperson of CCM
 Chairperson of CD
 Chairperson of MC
 Chairperson of AC

IHF Council 2021 — 2025

General conditions
If a continental confederation has at least 15 national federations as full members, it may nominate a council member for the continent that shall be confirmed by the IHF Congress. Each continental confederation may nominate one vice-president if it has at least 23 national federations as full members. The council shall convene at least twice a year. The term of office of council members shall be four years, re-election is possible. In case of urgent business, the president may seek to make resolutions and decisions by mail between council meetings. Council is the body that awards the IHF World Men's Handball Championship and IHF World Women's Handball Championship.

IHF Commission of Organising And Competitions
IHF Commission of Organising and Competition (COC) is composed of one chairperson and 7 members elected by the IHF Council.

IHF Playing Rules and Referees Commission
IHF Playing Rules and Referees Commission (PRC) is composed of one chairperson and 7 members elected by the IHF Council.

IHF Commission of Coaching and Methods
IHF Commission of Coaching and Methods (CCM) is composed of one chairperson and 7 members elected by the IHF Council.

IHF Medical Commission
IHF Medical Commission (MC) is composed of one chairperson and 7 members elected by the IHF Council.

IHF Commission for Development
IHF Commission for Development (CD) is composed of one chairperson and 7 members elected by the IHF Council.

IHF Interim Athletes' Commission
IHF Athletes' Commission is composed of one chairperson and 4 members elected by the players participating in the Summer Olympic Games every four years.

IHF Arbitration Commission
IHF Arbitration Commission is composed of one chairperson and 10 members elected by the IHF Congress.

IHF Arbitration Tribunal
IHF Arbitration Tribunal is composed of one chairperson and 10 members elected by the IHF Congress.

IHF Ethics Commission
IHF Ethics Commission is composed of one chairperson and 5 members elected by the IHF Congress.

IHF Beach Handball Working Group
IHF Beach Handball Working Group (BHWG) is composed of one chairman and 4 members elected by the IHF Council.

IHF Handball at School Working Group
IHF Handball at School Working Group is composed of one chairwoman and 2 members elected by the IHF Council.

IHF Wheelchair Handball Working Group
IHF Wheelchair Handball Working Group is composed of one chairman and 4 members elected by the IHF Council.

IHF Women’s Handball Working Group
IHF Women's Handball Working Group is composed of one chairwoman and 4 members elected by the IHF Council.

List of IHF Secretary Generals
Following is the list of IHF Secretary Generals.

List of IHF Treasurers

 Sandi Šola was asked by IHF Council to resign during the IHF Council meeting held in Herning (Denmark) on 19 December 2015. Then IHF 1st Vice-President Miguel Roca Mas (Spain) held the charge until the next IHF Congress in 2017.

List of IHF Managing Directors

References

External links 
 IHF Council

IHF Council